Georgia state or variation, may refer to:

Primarily
 Georgia State University ("State", "Georgia State"), a state university
 Georgia (U.S. state) ("Georgia state"), a state of the United States of America

Sports
 Georgia State Panthers, the sports teams representing Georgia State University
 Georgia State Stadium, Atlanta, Georgia, USA
 Georgia State Baseball Complex, Decatur, Georgia, USA
 Georgia State League, a class-D basketball league in the Georgia state, USA

Other uses
 Georgia State station, Atlanta, Georgia, USA; a train station
 Georgia State College, Savannah, Georgia, USA; founded as an HBCU
 Georgia State Prison, Reidsville, Georgia, USA; a maximum security penitentiary
 Georgia State Sanitarium, Milledgeville, Georgia, USA

See also

 
 State of Georgia (disambiguation)
 Georgia (disambiguation)